Jet line, jetline, or, variation, may refer to:

Aviation
 Airlines which fly jetliners
 Airway (aviation), pathway in the sky for jets
 Contrail, the line in the sky following jets

Airlines
 Jetlines (ICAO airline code: CJL; callsign: JETBUS), Canadian discount air carrier
 Jet Line International (ICAO airline code: MJL; callsign: MOLDJET), Moldovan airline, see List of defunct airlines of Moldova
 Eurojet Limited (ICAO airline code: JLN; callsign: JET LINE), Maltan airline, see List of airline codes (E)
 Jetline (ICAO airline code: JLE), see List of airlines of Equatorial Guinea

Other uses
 Jetline, a roller coaster

See also

 Jetstream, a high speed natural air stream in the upper atmosphere, a river of air, a conveyor line of weather
 Jet (disambiguation)
 Line (disambiguation)